
The Jazz Album: Watch What Happens is a 2006 studio album by the German baritone Thomas Quasthoff. The album was arranged by Alan Broadbent, Steve Gray, and Nan Schwartz.

Quasthoff was traditionally a singer of opera and lieder and this was his first album of jazz vocal music. The Jazz Album peaked at 19 on Billboard magazine's Top Classical Crossover Chart and was included on their European Top 100 Albums list.

In an interview with John Lewis in The Guardian, Quasthoff said that jazz standards and show tunes could be compared favourably with his usual repertoire of German lieder saying that "Of course I love Schubert lieder, but technically they are often simple folk songs. American show tunes are also folk songs in a way, but they are of a very high intellectual level. If you look at the quality of these compositions – harmonically, emotionally, lyrically – it is pure heaven".

Reception

AllMusic gave the album four stars out of five. In its review, James Mannheim wrote that "Quasthoff has the great virtue of approaching standards as songs that have new and personal meaning for him. ... there's a certain wide-eyed quality of discovery in Quasthoff's jazz singing that's immensely appealing. ... Quasthoff croons, slides, caresses the microphone, whispers, and bends tones with the best of them." Manheim described Quasthoff's performances on "Ac-cent-tchu-ate the Positive" and "They All Laughed" as possessing a "solid, chunky rhythmic quality" and said of his performance on "You and I" that " ... one realizes most fully that one is hearing a rare vocal virtuoso, and that one enjoys a rare vocal delight to its fullest".

John Lewis, writing in The Guardian said that The Jazz Album had " ...none of the grim rigidity associated with the classical singer – instead, Quastoff glides through a selection of showtunes and standards with a relaxed sense of swing, and a soft American accent that recalls, variously, Lou Rawls, Bing Crosby and Nat King Cole." The album was also positively received by Christoph Loudon in The Jazz Times.

Track listing 
 "There's a Boat That's Leavin' Soon for New York" (George Gershwin, Ira Gershwin, DuBose Heyward) – 2:56
 "Watch What Happens"  (Norman Gimbel, Michel Legrand, Jacques Demy) – 3:02
 "Secret Love" (Sammy Fain) – 4:08
 "You and I" (Stevie Wonder) – 4:52
 "Ac-Cent-Tchu-Ate the Positive" (Harold Arlen, Johnny Mercer) – 3:54
 "I've Grown Accustomed to Her Face" (Alan Jay Lerner, Frederick Loewe) – 4:53
 "Can't We Be Friends?" (Paul James, Kay Swift) – 2:46
 "Smile" (Charlie Chaplin, John Turner, Geoffrey Parsons) – 4:26
 "They All Laughed" (G. Gershwin, I. Gershwin) – 2:18
 "My Funny Valentine" (Lorenz Hart, Richard Rodgers) – 5:57
 "What Are You Doing the Rest of Your Life?" (Alan and Marilyn Bergman, Michel Legrand) – 5:44
 "(In My) Solitude" (Eddie DeLange, Duke Ellington, Irving Mills) – 4:30

Personnel 
 Thomas Quasthoff – vocals
 Till Brönner – flugelhorn, trumpet, vocal engineer, producer
 Axel Schlosser – trumpet
 Ruud Breuls – flugelhorn, trumpet
 Günter Bollmann – trombone
 Richard Todd – French horn
 Fiete Felsch – flute, alto saxophone
 Gary Foster – alto saxophone
 Andreas Maile – clarinet, tenor saxophone, flute
 Marcus Bartelt – bass clarinet, baritone saxophone
 Frank Chastenier – Rhodes piano
 Alan Broadbent – piano, arranger
 Chuck Loeb – guitar
 Karl Schloz – guitar
 Dieter Ilg – double bass
 Peter Erskine – drums, percussion
 Annemarie Moorcroft – viola
 Clemens Linder – violin
 Members of the Deutsches Symphonie–Orchester Berlin

Production
 Hartmut Bender – producer
 Alan Broadbent – producer
 Till Brönner – producer
 Steve Gray – arranger
 Nan Schwartz – arranger, conductor
 Tobias Lehmann – engineer
 Patrick Kirsammer – assistant engineer
 Bernie Grundman – mastering
 Anne Schumann – mixing
 Wolf Kampmann – liner notes

References 

2006 albums
Universal Records albums
Vocal jazz albums